Keep Breathing may refer to:

 Keep Breathing (album), a 2016 album by Jody McBrayer
 Keep Breathing (TV series), a 2022 American streaming television series
 "Keep Breathing", a song by Ingrid Michaelson from her 2008 album Be OK